Alexandra Ledermann (in France) and Pippa Funnell (in the UK) is a horse themed video gaming series by Lexis Numérique.

By 2009, more than a million copies of games in the series had been sold. The French and English series are named after the equestrians Alexandra Ledermann and Pippa Funnell, respectively.

Games

PC and home consoles 

 Alexandra Ledermann: Horse Riding Passion (Mary King's Riding Star)
 Alexandra Ledermann 2: Competition Horse Riding
 Alexandra Ledermann 3: Adventure Horse Riding (Riding Champion: Legacy of Rosemond Hill)
 Alexandra Ledermann 4: Adventures at stud (Saddle Up: Time to Ride; Let's Ride! Sunshine Stables)
 Alexandra Ledermann 5: The Heritage of the stud 
 Alexandra Ledermann 6: The School of Champions (Pippa Funnell 2 - Take The Reins)
 Alexandra Ledermann 7: The Challenge of the Golden Stirrup (Pippa Funnell: The Golden Stirrup Challenge)
 Alexandra Ledermann 8: The Secrets of the stud
 Alexandra Ledermann: The Stud of the Valley
 Alexandra Ledermann: The Wild Horse Hill
 Alexandra Ledermann: Stud's Summer

Portable consoles 

 Alexandra Ledermann (Game Boy Advance, 2003)
 Alexandra Ledermann: Adventures at a gallop (Horsez)
 Alexandra Ledermann (Nintendo DS, 2006)
 Alexandra Ledermann 2: My adventure at the stud
 Alexandra Ledermann 3D (Imagine Champion Rider 3D)
 Alexandra Ledermann: Adventures at summer camp

References 

Video game franchises
Lexis Numérique games